KCCL (101.5 MHz) is a commercial FM radio station licensed to Woodland, California, and serving the Sacramento metropolitan area.  It is owned by Results Radio and broadcasts a classic hits radio format, calling itself "101.5 K-Hits".  Its studios and offices are in North Sacramento.

KCCL has an effective radiated power (ERP) of 5,700 watts.  The transmitter site off Road 104 in Davis, California, near the Willow Slough.

History
On , the station first signed on the air.  The original call sign was KMJE and it called itself "Sunny 101.5."  

On August 10, 2011, KMJE replaced KUBA on a translator at 95.5 FM. On February 11, 2013, KMJE became a simulcast of KCCL sister station.  On March 14, 2013, the city of license changed from Gridley, California, to Woodland.  

On May 30, 2013, it officially switched signals and call letters with KMJE, becoming "101.5 K-Hits," but continued to simulcast until a new format on 92.1 FM was unveiled in July 2013.

On February 22, 2023 Lazer Licenses, LLC announced the purchase of Classic Hits “101.5 K-Hits” KCCL Woodland CA from Results Radio for $1.91 million. The sale will flip to Radio Lazer as Regional Mexican format.

Personalities

Jennifer Steele
Jennifer Steele is a veteran of 30 years in Sacramento radio.  She has worked at heritage stations including four terms  at Clear Channel and iHeart since the early 1990s. She was a part of the Breakfast Club on Cool 101.1, the News at Noon with Rick Stewart on KFBK, the Armstrong & Getty Show on KSTE and she was the First Full-time female KFBK lead Afternoon Traffic Anchor and news updates for Tom Sullivan and Kitty O'Neal at KFBK (as well as V101 and Y92.5. ) Jennifer also worked there as a News Anchor/Reporter and Producer/ Writer for KFBK and iHeart Radio (Alaska, Portland, Washington and California where she wrote, produced and voiced newscasts for stations all over the West Coast.) 

Her resume also includes several area morning shows including "Mornings with Dave and Jennifer at Mix 96", "The Jen and John Show at 95.3 KUIC", "Mornings with Chad and Jennifer on 101.9 the Wolf" She also worked at Fresh Country 98.5, New Country 105.1, KO93 and Kat Country.  Her radio jobs have included promotion, marketing, charity, production and copy writing, during her 30 years in the business. She remains active in local charity work and works as an MC for the Hard Rock Hotel & Casino Sacramento.

Joey Mitchell
Long-time Sacramento radio personality Joey Mitchell was the morning show on KCCL/K-HITS weekdays from 6:00am to 9:00am. Starting in 1969 in Southern California on radio station KVFM located in Panorama City in the San Fernando Valley, Joey gained attention thanks to the 1971 San Fernando 6.6 earthquake. Waking to the 6:00am shaking, Joey ran to the radio station located in the fourteen story Panorama Towers on Van Nuys Blvd. and began broadcasting emergency information to the local community. He was forced to evacuate the tall building by local police when aftershocks deemed the building unsafe. Joey did not leave the studio until he had the police actually order him to, live on the air. That story was heard by KPRO 1440 AM Riverside's general manager Howard Fisher and he immediately offered Joey a job.

KPRO was then owned by TV and radio personality Dick Clark and Joey's involvement with the station led to a longtime association with Dick Clark. In 1975, Joey moved his wife and sons to Northern California and Mitchell began 20 years as Sacramento's most-popular morning man with famed country station KRAK. His comedy and antics are legendary. He was named Billboard magazine's "Best Country DJ" in 1988 and was nominated again in 1992. Local TV station KXTV named him Sacramento's top radio personality two years-in-a-row. He has been featured in Sacramento Magazine, the Sacramento Bee, and other local publications. The State of California once declared a "Joey Mitchell Day." His on-air presence expanded country music's popularity in the Sacramento market.

Despite his success at KRAK, he was not immune to the changes on the radio dial. With music on the AM side becoming a rarity, Joey Mitchell joined KHYL-FM, an oldies channel, where "Mitchell and Company" was able to raise station ratings. When the new KRAK-FM with a country oldies format went on-the-air, Mitchell was brought aboard as the morning man. But continued movement on the FM dial and an eventual move to 1470AM would prove confusing to listeners. Even Joey Mitchell would find himself doing "afternoon drive." To keep up with all the changes, Willie Nelson's "On The Road Again" would receive substantial airplay. After the final demise of KRAK, he would returning to playing oldies, first at KOOL 101.9, now at KCCL/K-HITS 92.1. Joey Mitchell also owns his own advertising and production company, known as "Joey Mitchell Productions."

Big Jim Hall
Big Jim Hall, a veteran of 45 years on the Sacramento airwaves, hosted the afternoon show on KCCL/K-HITS weekdays from 4:00pm to 6:00pm from 2007 through 2017.   Called the "World's tallest disc jockey," Big Jim started his radio career at Merced's KYOS-AM before moving to Sacramento's KROY.   But it was at the legendary country station, KRAK-AM, where Big Jim Hall found his greatest fame.   For two decades he held the 2-6:00PM afternoon "drive" and like his friend and colleague, Joey Mitchell, was responsible for increasing the interest of country music in the greater Sacramento market.   After KRAK flipped its format, Hall moved to smooth jazz-oriented KSSJ then joined the original KCCL "KOOL 101.9" as the "Midday Mayor."   After this station flipped to a modern country format in 2007, both Hall and Mitchell joined the new KCCL.

Big Jim Hall stands 6' 7" and has made commercials for "Wagner's Big and Tall," "Yardbirds," "Denio's Farmers Market and Auction," and "Folsom Chevrolet." He currently represents "Hall's Window Center" and "Big Mountain Heating and Air." Hall is also a familiar face and voice on Sacramento's PBS station, KVIE, and is a ring announcer for professional boxing in the region.    Big Jim has long been very active in church, charitable, and community activities.

References

External links
Results Radio Website
Official Website

CCL
Classic hits radio stations in the United States
Radio stations established in 1996
1996 establishments in California